Aspidistra  is a genus of flowering plants in the family Asparagaceae, subfamily Nolinoideae, native to eastern and southeastern Asia, particularly China and Vietnam. They grow in shade under trees and shrubs. Their leaves arise more or less directly from ground level, where their flowers also appear. The number of species known has increased considerably from the 1980s onwards, with around 100 accepted . Aspidistra elatior is common worldwide as a foliage house plant that is very tolerant of neglect.

Description

Species of Aspidistra are perennial herbaceous plants growing from rhizomes. The leaves are either solitary or are grouped in small "tufts" of two to four. They arise more or less directly from the rhizome, rather than being borne on stems. Each leaf has a long stalk (petiole) and a blade with many veins. The flowering stem (scape) is usually very short so that the flowers appear low down among the leaves. The fleshy flowers are bell-, urn- or cup-shaped. They vary considerably in size and shape, although few are showy. The flower has a large stigma with a flattened top. The fruit is a berry, often with a single seed.

Taxonomy

The genus Aspidistra was named by the English botanist John Ker Gawler in 1822, as a blend of Greek ασπίς/ασπίδ- aspid-, meaning shield, and the name of the sister genus Tupistra. The genus was at one time placed in a broadly defined Liliaceae, along with many other lilioid monocots. It has also been placed in the families Convallariaceae and Ruscaceae. The APG III system of 2009 places it in the family Asparagaceae, subfamily Nolinoideae.

Species

Aspidistra is a genus that was largely ignored by field botanists until the 1980s onwards, and there has been a rapid rise in the number of recognised species since then. Some 8 to 10 species were known in the late 1970s; 30 new species were described from China in the 1980s. Subsequently, more new species were found in Vietnam. The online Flora of China uses a narrow definition of species, producing a total of about 55, saying that the genus has "never been well studied". In 2008, Tillich provided the key to the 93 species known at that time.

Plants of the World Online currently includes:

 Aspidistra acetabuliformis Y.Wan & C.C.Huang – China (Guangxi)
 Aspidistra alata Tillich – Vietnam (Cao Bang)
 Aspidistra albiflora C.R.Lin, W.B.Xu & Yan Liu
 Aspidistra albopurpurea Aver. & Tillich
 Aspidistra alternativa D.Fang & L.Y.Yu – China (Guangxi)
 Aspidistra anomala Aver. & Tillich
 Aspidistra arnautovii Tillich – Vietnam (Hai Phong)
 Aspidistra atrata Aver., Tillich & B.H.Quang
 Aspidistra atroviolacea Tillich(synonym A. renatae Bräuchler) – Vietnam (central)
 Aspidistra attenuata Hayata
 Aspidistra australis S.Z.He & W.F.Xu
 Aspidistra austrosinensis Y.Wan & C.C.Huang – China (Guangxi)
 Aspidistra austroyunnanensis G.W.Hu, Lei Cai & Q.F.Wang
 Aspidistra averyanovii N.S.Lý & Tillich
 Aspidistra babensis K.S.Nguyen, Aver. & Tillich
 Aspidistra bamaensis C.R.Lin, Y.Y.Liang & Yan Liu
 Aspidistra basalis Tillich
 Aspidistra bella Aver., Tillich & K.S.Nguyen
 Aspidistra bicolor Tillich – Vietnam (Thai Nguyen)
 Aspidistra bogneri Tillich – Vietnam (Ninh Binh)
 Aspidistra brachypetala C.R.Lin & B.Pan
 Aspidistra brachystyla Aver. & Tillich – Vietnam
 Aspidistra cadamensis N.S.Lý & Tillich
 Aspidistra caespitosa C.Pei – China (Sichuan)
 Aspidistra campanulata Tillich – Vietnam (Tuyen Quang)
 Aspidistra carinata Y.Wan & X.H.Lu – China (N Guangxi)
 Aspidistra carnosa Tillich – Vietnam (Lam Dong)
 Aspidistra cavicola D.Fang & K.C.Yen – China (NW Guangxi)
 Aspidistra cerina G.Z.Li & S.C.Tang – China (Guangxi)
 Aspidistra chishuiensis S.Z.He & W.F.Xu
 Aspidistra chongzuoensis C.R.Lin & Y.S.Huang
 Aspidistra chunxiuensis C.R.Lin & Yan Liu
 Aspidistra clausa Vislobokov
 Aspidistra claviformis Y.Wan – China (W Guangxi)
 Aspidistra cleistantha D.X.Nong & H.Z.Lü
 Aspidistra coccigera Aver. & Tillich
 Aspidistra columellaris Tillich
 Aspidistra connata Tillich – Vietnam (Gialai-Kontum)
 Aspidistra corniculata Vislobokov
 Aspidistra crassifila Yan Liu & C.I Peng
 Aspidistra cruciformis Y.Wan & X.H.Lu – China (NW Guangxi)
 Aspidistra cryptantha Tillich – Vietnam (Cao Bang)
 Aspidistra cyathiflora Y.Wan & C.C.Huang – China (Guangxi)
 Aspidistra cylindrica Vislobokov & Nuraliev
 Aspidistra daibuensis Hayata – Taiwan
 Aspidistra daxinensis M.F.Hou & Yan Liu
 Aspidistra deflexa Aver., Tillich & V.T.Pham
 Aspidistra dodecandra (Gagnep.) Tillich – Indo-China
 Aspidistra dolichanthera X.X.Chen – China (SW Guangxi)
 Aspidistra ebianensis K.Y.Lang & Z.Y.Zhu – China (Sichuan)
 Aspidistra elatior Blume (synonym A.insularis Tillich) Japan (Ōsumi & Kuroshima Islands): houseplant
 Aspidistra elegans Aver. & Tillich
 Aspidistra erecta Yan Liu & C.I Peng
 Aspidistra erosa Aver., Tillich, T.A.Le & K.S.Nguyen
 Aspidistra erythrocephala C.R.Lin & Y.Y.Liang
 Aspidistra extrorsa C.R.Lin & D.X.Nong
 Aspidistra fasciaria G.Z.Li – China (?Guangxi)
 Aspidistra fenghuangensis K.Y.Lang – China (W Hunan)
 Aspidistra fimbriata F.T.Wang & K.Y.Lang – China (Fujian, Guangdong, Hainan)
 Aspidistra flaviflora K.Y.Lang & Z.Y.Zhu – China (SC Sichuan)
 Aspidistra foliosa Tillich – Vietnam (Thua Thien)
 Aspidistra fungilliformis Y.Wan – China  (W Guangxi)
 Aspidistra geastrum Tillich – Vietnam (Thua Thien)
 Aspidistra glandulosa (Gagnep.) Tillich – Laos (La Khon)
 Aspidistra globosa Vislobokov & Nuraliev
 Aspidistra gracilis Tillich
 Aspidistra graminifolia Aver. & Tillich
 Aspidistra grandiflora Tillich – Vietnam (Hoa Binh)
 Aspidistra guangxiensis S.C.Tang & Yan Liu – China (Guangxi)
 Aspidistra hekouensis H.Li – China (SE Yunnan)
 Aspidistra hekouensis H.Li, C.L.Long & Bogner
 Aspidistra heterocarpa Aver., Tillich & V.T.Pham
 Aspidistra hezhouensis Q.Gao & Yan Liu
 Aspidistra huanjiangensis G.Z.Li & Y.G.Wei – China (Gunangxi)
 Aspidistra jiangjinensis S.R.Yi & C.R.Lin
 Aspidistra jiewhoei Tillich & Škornick.
 Aspidistra jingxiensis Yan Liu & C.R.Lin
 Aspidistra khangii Aver. & Tillich
 Aspidistra laongamensis C.R.Lin & X.Y.Huang
 Aspidistra laotica Aver. & Tillich
 Aspidistra lateralis Tillich – Vietnam (Thua Thien)
 Aspidistra leshanensis K.Y.Lang & Z.Y.Zhu – China (SC Sichuan)
 Aspidistra letreae Aver., Tillich & T.A.Le
 Aspidistra leucographa C.R.Lin & C.Y.Zou
 Aspidistra leyeensis Y.Wan & C.C.Huang – China (NW Guangxi)
 Aspidistra liboensis S.Z.He & J.Y.Wu
 Aspidistra linearifolia Y.Wan & C.C.Huang – China (W Guangxi)
 Aspidistra lingchuanensis C.R.Lin & L.F.Guo
 Aspidistra lingyunensis C.R.Lin & L.F.Guo
 Aspidistra lobata Tillich – China (Sichuan)
 Aspidistra locii Arnautov & Bogner – Vietnam
 Aspidistra longanensis Y.Wan – China (WC Guangxi)
 Aspidistra longgangensis C.R.Lin, Y.S.Huang & Yan Liu
 Aspidistra longiconnectiva C.T.Lu, K.C.Chuang & J.C.Wang
 Aspidistra longifolia Hook.f. – India
 Aspidistra longiloba G.Z.Li – China (Guangxi)
 Aspidistra longipedunculata D.Fang – China (SW Guangxi)
 Aspidistra longipetala S.Z.Huang – China (C Guangxi)
 Aspidistra longituba Yan Liu & C.R.Lin
 Aspidistra longshengensis C.R.Lin & W.B.Xu
 Aspidistra lubae Aver. & Tillich
 Aspidistra luochengensis B.Pan & C.R.Lin
 Aspidistra luodianensis D.D.Tao – China (NW Guangxi, S Guizhou)
 Aspidistra lurida Ker Gawl. – China (Guangdong, NC Guangxi, SC Guizhou) - type species
 Aspidistra lutea Tillich – Vietnam (Son La)
 Aspidistra maguanensis S.Z.He & D.H.Lv
 Aspidistra marasmioides Tillich – Vietnam (Hai Phong)
 Aspidistra marginella D.Fang & L.Zeng – China (SW Guangxi)
 Aspidistra medusa Aver., K.S.Nguyen & Tillich
 Aspidistra micrantha Vislobokov & Nuraliev
 Aspidistra minor Vislobokov, Nuraliev & M.S.Romanov
 Aspidistra minutiflora Stapf – China (N Guangdong, Guangxi, ?Guizhou, Hainan, Hong Kong, SW Hunan)
 Aspidistra mirostigma Tillich & Škornick.
 Aspidistra molendinacea G.Z.Li & S.C.Tang – China (Guangzi)
 Aspidistra multiflora Aver. & Tillich
 Aspidistra muricata F.C.How – China (NC & W Guangxi)
 Aspidistra mushaensis Hayata – Taiwan
 Aspidistra nanchuanensis Tillich – China (Sichuan)
 Aspidistra nankunshanensis Yan Liu & C.R.Lin
 Aspidistra neglecta Aver., Tillich & K.S.Nguyen
 Aspidistra nigra Aver., Tillich & K.S.Nguyen
 Aspidistra nikolaii Aver. & Tillich – Vietnam (Annamite Mts.)
 Aspidistra nutans Aver. & Tillich
 Aspidistra obconica C.R.Lin & Yan Liu
 Aspidistra oblanceifolia F.T.Wang & K.Y.Lang – China (S Guizhou, W Hubei, Sichuan)
 Aspidistra obliquipeltata D.Fang & L.Y.Yu – China (Guangxi)
 Aspidistra oblongifolia F.T.Wang & K.Y.Lang – China (N Guangxi)
 Aspidistra obtusata Vislobokov
 Aspidistra omeiensis Z.Y.Zhu & J.L.Zhang – China (Sichuan)
 Aspidistra opaca Tillich – Vietnam (Khanh Hoa)
 Aspidistra ovatifolia Yan Liu & C.R.Lin
 Aspidistra oviflora Aver. & Tillich
 Aspidistra papillata G.Z.Li – China (Guangxi)
 Aspidistra patentiloba Y.Wan & X.H.Lu – China (C Guangxi)
 Aspidistra paucitepala Vislobokov, Nuraliev & D.D.Sokoloff
 Aspidistra petiolata Tillich – Vietnam (Thua Thien)
 Aspidistra phanluongii Vislobokov – Vietnam
 Aspidistra pileata D.Fang & L.Y.Yu – China (Guangxi)
 Aspidistra pingfaensis S.Z.He & Q.W.Sun
 Aspidistra pingtangensis S.Z.He, W.F.Xu & Q.W.Sun
 Aspidistra pulchella B.M.Wang & Yan Liu
 Aspidistra punctata Lindl. – China (Guandong, Hong Kong)
 Aspidistra punctatoides Yan Liu & C.R.Lin
 Aspidistra purpureomaculata H.C.Xi, J.T.Yin & W.G.Wang
 Aspidistra qijiangensis S.Z.He & X.Y.Luo
 Aspidistra quadripartita G.Z.Li & S.C.Tang - China (Guangxi)
 Aspidistra quangngaiensis N.S.Lý, Haev. & Tillich
 Aspidistra radiata G.W.Hu & Q.F.Wang
 Aspidistra recondita Tillich – Vietnam (location not known)
 Aspidistra retusa K.Y.Lang & S.Z.Huang – China (NE Guangxi)
 Aspidistra revoluta Hao Zhou, S.R.Yi & Q.Gao
 Aspidistra ronganensis C.R.Lin, Jing Liu & W.B.Xu
 Aspidistra sarcantha Aver., Tillich, T.A.Le & K.S.Nguyen
 Aspidistra saxicola Y.Wan – China (WC Guangxi)
 Aspidistra semiaperta Aver. & Tillich
 Aspidistra sessiliflora Aver. & Tillich
 Aspidistra sichuanensis K.Y.Lang & Z.Y.Zhu – China (Guangxi, Guizhou, W Hunan, Sichuan, Yunnan)
 Aspidistra sinensis Aver. & Tillich
 Aspidistra sinuata Aver. & Tillich
 Aspidistra spinula S.Z.He – China (Guizhou)
 Aspidistra stellata Aver. & Tillich
 Aspidistra stenophylla C.R.Lin & R.C.Hu
 Aspidistra stricta Tillich – Vietnam (Lam Dong)
 Aspidistra subrotata Y.Wan & C.C.Huang – China (S & W Guangxi), Vietnam (Thai Nguyen)
 Aspidistra superba Tillich – Vietnam (Ninh Binh)
 Aspidistra sutepensis K.Larsen – Vietnam (Paypa)
 Aspidistra synpetala C.R.Lin & Yan Liu
 Aspidistra tenuifolia C.R.Lin & J.C.Yang
 Aspidistra tillichiana O.Colin
 Aspidistra tonkinensis (Gagnep.) F.T.Wang & K.Y.Lang – China (NW Guangxi, S Guizhou, SE Yunnan), Vietnam
 Aspidistra triloba F.T.Wang & K.Y.Lang – China (SC Hunan, W Jiangxi)
 Aspidistra triquetra Aver., Son, Tillich & K.S.Nguyen
 Aspidistra triradiata Vislobokov
 Aspidistra truongii Aver. & Tillich – Vietnam
 Aspidistra tubiflora Tillich – China (Sichuan)
 Aspidistra typica Baill. – China (SW Guangxi, SE Yunnan), Vietnam
 Aspidistra umbrosa Tillich – Vietnam (location not known)
 Aspidistra urceolata F.T.Wang & K.Y.Lang – China (Guizhou)
 Aspidistra ventricosa Tillich & Škornick.
 Aspidistra verruculosa Aver., Tillich & D.D.Nguyen - Vietnam (Di Linh plateau)
 Aspidistra vietnamensis (Aver. & Tillich) Aver. & Tillich
 Aspidistra viridiflora Vislobokov & Nuraliev
 Aspidistra wujiangensis W.F.Xu & S.Z.He
 Aspidistra xichouensis Lei Cai, Z.L.Dao & G.W.Hu
 Aspidistra xilinensis Y.Wan & X.H.Lu – China (NW Guangxi)
 Aspidistra xuansonensis Vislobokov
 Aspidistra yizhouensis B.Pan & C.R.Lin
 Aspidistra yunwuensis S.Z.He & W.F.Xu
 Aspidistra zhangii Aver., Tillich & K.S.Nguyen
 Aspidistra zhenganensis S.Z.He & Y.Wang
 Aspidistra zinaidae Aver. & Tillich
 Aspidistra zongbayi K.Y.Lang & Z.Y.Zhu – China (Sichuan)

Distribution and ecology

Species of Aspidistra are part of the ground flora, growing in forests and under shrubs, in areas of high rainfall, from eastern India, Indochina and China through to Japan. The largest number of species are found in Guangxi Province, China, with Vietnam occupying second place. Few species have a broad distribution, with many being endemic to China or Vietnam.

It has long been said that slugs and snails pollinate Aspidistra flowers. This has been described as a "myth". Amphipods, small terrestrial crustaceans, are responsible for pollinating A. elatior in Japan. Amphipods have also been shown to pollinate species of Aspidistra introduced to Australia. Springtails and fungus gnats have also been suggested as pollinators. The newly described Vietnamese species A. phanluongii is probably pollinated by flies of the genus Megaselia.

Cultivation and uses

Aspidistra elatior, the "cast-iron plant", is a popular houseplant, surviving shade, cool conditions and neglect. In addition to shade, aspidistras require an open, acidic and humus-rich soil. Species suggested for growing outdoors in the UK include A. diabuensis, A. elatior, A. lurida,  A. typica, A. zongbyi and their cultivars.

In Japan, leaves of A. elatior have traditionally been cut into pieces and used in bento and osechi boxes to keep each food separated.  However, imitations called "baran" are commonly used now.

In popular culture

As a popular foliage houseplant, A. elatior became popular in late Victorian Britain and was so common that it became a "symbol of dull middle-class respectability".  As such, it was central to George Orwell's novel Keep the Aspidistra Flying, as a symbol of the need of the middle class to maintain respectability according to Gordon Comstock, the novel's protagonist. It was further immortalised in the 1938 song "The Biggest Aspidistra in the World", which, as sung by Gracie Fields, became a popular wartime classic. An aspidistra is mentioned in the Wallace and Gromit short, "The Autochef", from the Cracking Contraptions series. In Dorothy L. Sayer's "Busman's Honeymoon", an aspidistra functions as murder weapon and a recurrent joke .

Aspidistras can withstand deep shade, neglect, dry soil, hot temperatures and polluted indoor air (from burning coal or natural gas) but are sensitive to bright sunlight.

"Aspidistra" was the codename (inspired by the above song) of a very powerful British radio transmitter used for propaganda and deception purposes against Nazi Germany during World War II.

The 1980s British television show The Adventure Game featured a moving aspidistra called the Rangdo of Arg, operated by Kenny Baker.

References

Notes

Bibliography

External links 

 Gallery of Aspidistra Juniper Level Botanic Gardens Aspidistra Collection

 
Asparagaceae genera
Garden plants of Asia